The Kraków Voivodeship was a voivodeship (province) in the Kingdom of Poland from the 14th century to the partition of Poland in 1795 (see History of Poland during the Piast dynasty, Kingdom of Poland (1385–1569), and Polish–Lithuanian Commonwealth). Located in the southwestern corner of the country, it was part of the Lesser Poland province (together with two other voivodeships of Poland: Sandomierz Voivodeship, and Lublin Voivodeship).

Kraków Voivodeship emerged from the Duchy of Kraków, which was created as Seniorate Province in the Testament of Bolesław III Krzywousty (1138). According to Zygmunt Gloger, it was one of the richest provinces of the Kingdom of Poland, with salt mines in Bochnia and Wieliczka, silver and lead mines in Olkusz, and very fertile soil around Proszowice. Its boundaries changed little for centuries. In 1457, the Duchy of Oświęcim was incorporated into the voivodeship, in 1564 – the Duchy of Zator (the Silesian County was created out of the two), and in 1790, the Duchy of Siewierz. Among cities and towns of contemporary Poland, which were part of Kraków Voivodeship, are Będzin, Biała, Bochnia, Brzesko, Częstochowa, Dąbrowa Górnicza, Jasło, Jaworzno, Jędrzejów, Krzepice, Kłobuck, Miechów, Nowy Sącz, Nowy Targ, Oświęcim, Sosnowiec, Szczekociny, Zakopane, Zator, Zawiercie, and Żywiec. In the first partition of Poland, in 1772 Habsburg monarchy annexed southern half of the voivodeship (south of the Vistula). In 1795, the third and final partition of Poland, Austria annexed the remaining part of the province, with the exception of its northwestern corner (around Częstochowa), which was seized by the Kingdom of Prussia, as New Silesia.

Zygmunt Gloger in his monumental book Historical Geography of the Lands of Old Poland gives a detailed description of Kraków Voivodeship:

Voivodeship Governor (Wojewoda) seat: 
 Kraków

Sejmiks (or territorial) seat:
 Proszowice

Regional council (sejmik generalny) seat: 
 Nowe Miasto Korczyn

Voivodes 
 Skarbmir 1106–1117
 Klemens 1123–1168 [1]
 Mikołaj Gryfita ?-1202
 Marek z Brzeźnicy 1176-c. 1226
 Teodor Gryfita ?-1237
 Włodzimierz 1191–1241
 Klemens z Ruszczy ?-1256
 Klemens Latoszyński 1213–1265
 Sulisław z Branic 1232–1283
 Piotr Bogoria 1240–1290
 Mikołaj Łagiewnicki 1245–1290
 Wierzbięta z Ruszczy 1246–1324
 Tomisław Mokrski 1276–1326
 Mikołaj Bogoria 1291–1346
 Andrzej 1309–1354
 Mścigniew Czelej 1298–1357
 Imram 1312–1357
 Andrzej Tęczyński 1318–1368
 Dobiesław Kurozwęcki 1306–1397
 Spytko II of Melsztyn 1351–1399
 Jan z Tarnowa przed 1349–1409
 Piotr Kmita 1348–1409
 Jan Tarnowski 1367 -1433
 Piotr Szafraniec ?-1437
 Jan Czyżowski 1373–1459
 Jan z Tęczyna między (1408–1410) – 1470
 Jan Pilecki 1410–1476
 Dziersław Rytwiański 1414–1478
 Jan Rytwiański 1422–1479
 Jan Amor Młodszy Tarnowski 1425–1500
 Spytek III Jarosławski 1436–1519
 Piotr Kmita z Wiśnicza 1442–1505
 Jan Feliks Tarnowski 1471–1507
 Mikołaj Kamieniecki 1460–1515
 Krzysztof Szydłowiecki 1467–1532
 Andrzej Tęczyński ?-1536
 Otto Chodecki 1467–1534
 Jan Amor Tarnowski 1488–1561
 Piotr Kmita Sobieński 1477–1553
 Mikołaj Herburt Odnowski 1505–1555
 Stanisław Tęczyński 1521–1561
 Spytek Jordan 1519–1580
 Stanisław Myszkowski
 Stanisław Barzi 1529–1571
 Jan Firlej 1515–1574
 Piotr Zborowski
 Andrzej Tęczyński  ?-1588
 Mikołaj Firlej 1532–1601
 Mikołaj Zebrzydowski 1553–1620
 Jan Magnus Tęczyński 1579–1637
 Stanisław Lubomirski 1583–1649
 Władysław Dominik                       * Zasławski-Ostrogski 1618–1656
 Władysław Myszkowski 1600–1658
 Stanisław Rewera Potocki 1579–1667
 Michał Zebrzydowski 1617–1667
 Jan Wielopolski (starszy) 1605–1668
 Aleksander Michał Lubomirski 1598–1677
 Jan Leszczyński 1598–1693
 Dymitr Jerzy Wiśniowiecki 1631–1682
 Andrzej Potocki ?-1691
 Feliks Kazimierz Potocki 1633–1702
 Hieronim Augustyn Lubomirski 1633–1706
 Marcin Kątski 1635–1710
 Franciszek Lanckoroński ok. 1645–1715
 Janusz Antoni Wiśniowiecki 1678–1741
 Jerzy Dominik Lubomirski 1665–1727
 Franciszek Wielopolski 1658–1732
 Teodor Lubomirski 1683–1745
 Jan Klemens Branicki 1689–1771
 Wacław Rzewuski 1706–1779
 Antoni Lubomirski 1715–1782
 Stanisław Kostka Dembiński 1708–1781
 Piotr Małachowski 1730–1797

Administrative division 
In 1397, the Voivodeship was officially divided into three counties (powiats):
 Proszowice County (Powiat Proszowicki), Proszowice
 Żarnowiec County (Powiat Żarnowiecki), Żarnowiec
 Kraków County (Powiat Krakowski), Kraków

In the 16th century, the number of counties rose to seven:
 Proszowice County (Powiat Proszowicki), Proszowice
 Lelów County (Powiat Lelowski), Lelów
 Szczyrzyc County (Powiat Szczyrzycki), Szczyrzyc
 Książ County (Powiat Ksiąski), Książ Wielki
 Nowy Sącz County (Powiat Sądecki), Nowy Sącz
 Biecz County (Powiat Biecki), Biecz
 Silesian County (Powiat Śląski)
 Duchy of Zator (Księstwo Zatorskie), Zator
 Duchy of Oświęcim (Księstwo Oświęcimskie), Oświęcim

Also, the Duchy of Siewierz, (Księstwo Siewierskie), with capital in Siewierz, was ruled by the Bishops of Kraków, but officially, it was not part of the Voivodeship until 1792, when it was annexed into Poland.

Neighbouring Voivodeships:
 Sieradz Voivodeship
 Sandomierz Voivodeship
 Ruthenian Voivodeship
 Silesia (not part of Poland at that time).

Cities and towns of Kraków Voivodeship (1662)

Cities and towns of Proszowice County 
 Kraków,
 Kazimierz,
 Podzamcze (now a district of Kraków),
 Kleparz, 
 Skalbmierz,
 Będzin,
 Chrzanów, 
 Sławków,
 Olkusz,
 Działoszyce,
 Proszowice,
 Słomniki,
 Koszyce,
 Nowa Góra,
 Nowe Brzesko

Cities and towns of Szczyrzyc County 
 Myślenice,
 Tymbark,
 Bochnia,
 Uście Solne,
 Nowy Wiśnicz,
 Jordanów,
 Wieliczka,
 Dobczyce,
 Skawina,
 Lanckorona.

Cities and towns of Silesian County 
 Wadowice,
 Żywiec,
 Kęty,
 Oświęcim,
 Zator.

Cities and towns of Książ County 
 Miechów,
 Jędrzejów (in 1682 known as Andrzejów),
 Wodzisław,
 Żarnowiec,
 Książ Wielki,
 Wolbrom,
 Skała.

Cities and towns of Nowy Sącz County 
 Wojnicz,
 Czchów,
 Nowy Sącz (Nowy Sandecz),
 Stary Sącz (Stary Sandecz),
 Piwniczna,
 Nowy Targ,
 Lipnica Murowana,
 Zakliczyn,
 Tylicz,
 Muszyna,
 Krościenko nad Dunajcem,
 Grybów.

Cities and towns of Lelów County 
 Kromołów (now a district of Zawiercie),
 Mrzygłód (now a district of Myszków),
 Włodowice,
 Żarki,
 Częstochowa,
 Kłobuck,
 Krzepice,
 Mstów,
 Przyrów,
 Lelów,
 Pilica,
 Szczekociny,
 Kossów.

Cities and towns of Biecz County 
 Bobowa,
 Dukla,
 Gorlice,
 Nowy Żmigród,
 Ciężkowice,
 Jasło,
 Dębowiec,
 Osiek Jasielski,
 Jaśliska,
 Biecz.

References 
Zygmunt Gloger, Historical Geography of Ancient Poland, Kraków Voivodeship 
Adolf Pawiński, "Polska XVI wieku pod względem geograficzno-statystycznym" Tom III, Małopolska. Warszawa 1886

 
Voivodeships of the Polish–Lithuanian Commonwealth
History of Kraków
1795 disestablishments in the Polish–Lithuanian Commonwealth
States and territories established in the 14th century
14th-century establishments in Poland

pt:Voivodia da Cracóvia